Katsina United Football Club is a Nigerian football club based in the town of Katsina, Katsina State.

History
Founded in 1994, they were promoted to the Nigerian Premier League in 1997, placing 12th in their debut season but were disbanded after relegation in 2001. The Katsina State Government began plans to resurrect the team in April 2008. The club was reestablished in 2009 and was renamed "Spotlights FC", they debuted in the Nigeria National League for their first year.
In February 2016, the team reverted to their original name, Katsina United. In October 2016, Katsina United won promotion back to the Nigeria Professional Football League, returning 15 years after they were last relegated.

Stadium
They played the first half of their first season after re-establishment at the Sardauna Memorial Stadium in Gusau while Katsina Township Stadium was being renovated. The club later moved to the new all-seater Muhammadu Dikko Stadium in Katsina.

Achievements
Nigerian FA Cup: 0
Runners-up: 1995, 1996, 1997

Nigeria National League: 1
Champions: 2016

Performances in CAF competitions
African Cup Winners' Cup: 1 appearance
1996 – Quarter-Finals

CAF Cup: 1 appearance
2001 – Withdrew Second round

Team
As of 30 December 2020

References

Football clubs in Nigeria
Katsina State
Association football clubs established in 1994
1994 establishments in Nigeria